In molecular biology, TBR5 is a member of the C/D class of snoRNA which contain the C (UGAUGA) and D (CUGA) box motifs. Most of the members of the box C/D family function in directing site-specific 2'-O-methylation of substrate RNAs.

Together with TBR7 and TBR17 it is a part of a tandemly repeated snoRNA gene cluster, located within the spliced leader RNA (SLA). The cluster genes are produced as polycistronic RNA.

See also 

Small nucleolar RNA TBR2

References

External links 
 

Small nuclear RNA